Alicia Magaz Medrano (born 24 May 1994) is a Spanish field hockey forward who is part of the Spain women's national field hockey team.

She was part of the Spanish team at the 2016 Summer Olympics in Rio de Janeiro, where they finished eighth. On club level she plays for Club de Campo in Spain

References

External links
 
 
 http://www.laliga4sports.es/eventos/jjoo-rio-2016/deportista/alicia-magaz
 https://www.noroestemadrid.com/tag/alicia-magaz/

1994 births
Living people
Olympic field hockey players of Spain
Field hockey players at the 2016 Summer Olympics
Field hockey players at the 2020 Summer Olympics
Spanish female field hockey players
Place of birth missing (living people)
Female field hockey forwards
Club de Campo Villa de Madrid players
Mannheimer HC players